The East Valley Tribune is a newspaper concentrated on cities within the East Valley region of metropolitan Phoenix, including Mesa, Tempe, Chandler, Gilbert, and Queen Creek.

Formerly a daily newspaper, the Tribune resulted from the combination of local newspapers acquired by Cox Enterprises: The Tempe Daily News, the Mesa Tribune, the Gilbert Tribune, the Scottsdale Progress, and the Chandler Arizonan.

History 
Attorney Alfred P. Shewman and Judge W.D. Morton founded Mesa's first newspaper, the Evening Weekly Free Press, in 1891. In 1899, Judge W.D. Morton sold out to Shewman, who died in 1901.

Frank T. Pomeroy and Harry D. Haines bought the paper in 1910 and converted it into a daily publication, The Evening Press. They then sold the paper in 1911. 

In 1913, The Evening Press became the Mesa Daily Tribune, and in 1925, the paper was renamed the Mesa Daily Journal. The name changed again to the Daily Mesa Evening Journal in 1928.

In 1932, Southside Publishing Company, a corporation of Mesa and Chandler businessmen, acquired ownership. Over the next 7 years, stock was purchased by P.R. Mitten and his son, Charles until 1939 when Charles Mitten bought out his father's share. Mitten began printing the paper five days a week after World War II under the name of the Mesa Daily Tribune. In 1950 Mitten sold the paper to David W. Calvert.

In 1952, the Tribune Publishing Company was incorporated.

On January 26, 1956, the Mesa Daily Tribune publishing plant on Macdonald Street was destroyed by fire and opened five months later at 120 W. 1st Ave, Mesa.

In 1977, Cox Enterprises of Atlanta, Georgia, purchased the Mesa Daily Tribune from Calvert. Cox Newspapers then purchased the Tempe Daily News in 1980 and the Chandler Arizonan in 1983. It started the Gilbert Tribune in 1990, and purchased the Scottsdale Progress in 1993. David C. Scott was appointed president of Cox Arizona Publications and publisher of the Mesa Tribune in 1986, succeeding Roger Kintzel.

In December 1996, Cox Newspapers sold its newspaper holdings to Thomson Newspapers.

In May 1997, under the leadership of its publisher, Karen Wittmer, all five newspapers were combined into one newspaper, The Tribune. The paper served eastern Maricopa County with a Scottsdale edition for the northern communities.

In December 1997, the Daily News-Sun in Sun City, Arizona, joined the Tribune as part of its Phoenix SMG (Strategic Marketing Group). The Ahwatukee Foothills News, which covered news on the southeastern border of Phoenix, joined in November 1998.

In December 1999, The Tribune was renamed the East Valley Tribune and, in August 2000, Thomson Newspapers sold its Arizona newspaper holdings to Freedom Communications, Inc. of Irvine, California

On October 6, 2008, publisher Julie Moreno announced that, as of 2009, the newspaper would cease publishing in Scottsdale and Tempe. Additionally, it would publish only four days a week in the remainder of its circulation area, although it would publish four distinct editions serving Mesa, Chandler, Gilbert and Queen Creek. More than 140 staff members' jobs were eliminated with the move.

On April 20, 2009, the Tribune was awarded the Pulitzer Prize for Local Reporting after the paper ran a five-part series on how the efforts of Maricopa County, Arizona sheriff Joe Arpaio against illegal immigrants detracted from quality of law enforcement services provided by his agency. By the time the award was announced, co-author of the series Paul Giblin had been laid off during a round of Tribune cutbacks and co-author Ryan Gabrielson left the following summer.

Freedom Communications filed for Chapter 11 reorganization on September 1, 2009, in federal bankruptcy court in Delaware. As a result, on November 2, 2009, the East Valley Tribune announced that it would cease operations on December 31, 2009. However, a new buyer was found, and the Tribune, the Daily News-Sun, the Ahwatukee Foothills News, Glendale/Peoria Today and Surprise Today were sold to 10/13 Communications LLC, an affiliate of Boulder, Colorado-based Thirteenth Street Media.

The transaction was approved by the bankruptcy judge in March 2010, as part of Freedom's reorganization process. The Tribune continued operations while the sale was pending. 10/13 Communications already owned a free-distribution weekly called the Explorer, serving Oro Valley and Marana in north suburban Tucson. In November 2010, it was announced that as a result of the sale, the Tribune's main offices, including all editorial and advertising operations, would relocate by early 2011 to office space at Fountainhead Corporate Park in Tempe, adjacent to Interstate 10 and Broadway Road. Circulation was also reinstated in Tempe and Chandler.

On October 8, 2011, Terry Horne was named publisher and editor of the East Valley Tribune. 

In early 2012, the now-former Tribune complex at 120 W. 1st Avenue, which had been vacated by 10/13 Communications, was acquired by a private developer, extensively renovated and leased to the State of Arizona as the Mesa neighborhood offices for the Department of Economic Security. 

Between 2011 and 2016, the Tribune scaled back its publication schedule from four days a week to three days (Wednesday, Friday and Sunday), then to two days (Wednesday and Sunday), and finally to just a Sunday Edition. 

In late January 2016, Scottsdale-based Times Media Group, established by entrepreneur Steve Strickbine in 1997 and the owner of 15 local community news publications including College Times, Scottsdale Airpark News and the website Phoenix.org, acquired the East Valley Tribune and Ahwatukee Foothills News from 10/13 Communications. Times Media Group immediately assumed day-to-day operations; 10/13's other Arizona community newspapers were not included in the sale. The Daily News-Sun, Glendale/Peoria Today and Surprise Today were later sold to Independent Newspapers Inc.

Today, the East Valley Tribune publishes once a week on Sunday with a circulation of more than 140,000 copies and more than 405,000 weekly readers. Eighty-five percent of the newspapers are delivered directly to the driveways of East Valley families, while the remaining 15 percent are distributed at high-traffic locations and outlets.

See also
 Phoenix Tribune

References

External links
 

Newspapers published in Arizona
Phoenix metropolitan area
Freedom Communications
Publications established in 1891
1891 establishments in Arizona Territory